National Defense University is a military university established in 2022 and primarily located in Baku, Azerbaijan. The university is based on the Turkish National Defense University as part of an effort to make the Azerbaijani Armed Forces mirror the Turkish Armed Forces. In June 2022, the professor, Lieutenant General Heydar Piriyev, who previously headed the War College of the Azerbaijani Armed Forces, started working as a rector.

The National Defense University was established in 2022 by the order of the President Ilham Aliyev.

Composition

Previously existing institutions under the NDU 

 Training and Education Center of the Armed Forces
 Heydar Aliyev Military Institute (formerly the Azerbaijan Higher Military Academy)
 Secondary Military Medical School of Azerbaijan
 Military Medical Faculty of Azerbaijan Medical University
 Military lyceums
 Jamshid Nakhchivanski Military Lyceum
 Heydar Aliyev Military Lyceum

New institutions created under the NDU 

 Military Scientific Research Institute
 Military Administration Institute

References 

Educational institutions established in 2022
2022 establishments in Azerbaijan
Military academies of Azerbaijan
Military units and formations established in 2022
Education in Azerbaijan